Nowe Ateny (New Athens) is the abbreviated title of the first Polish-language encyclopedia, authored by the 18th-century Polish priest Benedykt Joachim Chmielowski. The first edition was published in 1745–1746 in Lwów (Lviv); the second edition was updated and expanded in 1754–1764.

The first part of the full title was: New Athens or the Academy full of all science, divided into subjects and classes, for the wise ones to record, for the idiots to learn, for the politicians to practice, for the melancholics to entertain issued...

Organization and content
The first edition of the encyclopedia contains 938 pages, organized by subject rather than alphabetically.  Chmielowski compiled data from a few hundred references, dating from antiquity to his contemporary.

Almost every sentence in the book is in-line referenced, frequently in Latin, a lingua franca in Poland among the educated classes as in most of 18th centuryCentral and Western Europe. Chmielowski added personal annotations as well; for example, "Dragons existed for sure, I myself held, visiting Radziwills' castle, a rib of a dragon bigger than a regular sabre". Judging from the inclusion of numerous stories, anecdotes, and descriptions of strange phenomena and exotic countries (like China and Japan), the encyclopedia was directed towards a rather popular audience and aimed to arouse readers' curiosity and desire for learning.

Legacy

The encyclopedia was the object of harsh critique in the Enlightenment period. It was given as an example of ignorance, stupidity, and superstition, contrasting with Enlightenment thought.

Nowe Ateny is the source of a few memorable and amusing "definitions", often quoted in Poland to this day:
Horse: Everyone can see what a horse is. (pol. Koń jaki jest, każdy widzi)
Goats, a stinking kind of animal. (pol. Kozy, śmierdzący rodzaj zwierząt)

The humor was probably unintentional by the author. Rather, he did not see the benefit of defining the most common animals of the time and place for his intended audience. Furthermore, the entry for "Horse" does contain more detailed exposition beyond the initial "definition".

In modern Polish, the above definition of the horse is sometimes used as a colorful equivalent of the statement "the concept is more obvious than it appears to be from its more technical definition".

In the last few decades, opinions about Nowe Ateny have changed for the positive. The quotations above are fragments taken from a broader context. For example, Chmielowski wrote more than 15 pages about the horses in his monumental, 3000-page encyclopedia (four volumes).

References

Notes

Bibliography
 Wojciech Paszyński, Ksiądz Benedykt Chmielowski – życie i dzieło Diogenesa firlejowskiego, "Nasza Przeszłość" 2015/2, t. 124, s. 105–136.
 Wojciech Paszyński, Czarna legenda "Nowych Aten" Benedykta Chmielowskiego i próby jej przezwyciężenia, "Zeszyty Naukowe Uniwersytetu Jagiellońskiego. Prace Historyczne" 2014/1(141), s. 37–59.

External links
 Text 
 Scanned text , 
 New Athens by Reverend Benedykt Chmielowski – its Black Legend and a Possible Line of Defence 

Latin encyclopedias
Polish encyclopedias
1745 books
1754 books
18th-century encyclopedias